Heber Holiday (2007), also known as Shooting Star, is a comedy film starring Torrey DeVitto as Sierra Young. Other cast included Scott S. Anderson, Erin Chambers, Jimmy Chunga, Michael Birkeland and Thurl Bailey. The film was directed by McKay Daines. The film won six awards in total. The DVD was released on May 5, 2009 under the name Shooting Star.

Plot
Sierra Young is a rising actress in Hollywood, making $10 million per picture. She's also a spoiled celebrity, who is partying all night, complaining on movie sets and unable to perform well. After a tantrum, in which she gets two black eyes, the director has her sent to a rehab clinic in a remote Utah town. Within a day, she's run away and is taken in by Nettie, who runs a bed and breakfast. Sierra also meets Nettie's grandson, Tyler, head of the local community theater. Sierra invents a name, tells Nettie a wild story, and reads for a part in Tyler's production of "Taming of the Shrew." Meanwhile, her entourage hires a private eye to find her.

Cast 

 Torrey DeVitto as Sierra Young
Erin Chambers as Jodi
Thurl Bailey as Mutumbo
Scott S. Anderson as Felix
 K.C. Clyde as Tyler
 Jimmy Chunga as Hound
 Matthew Bellows as Jeff
 Michael Flynn as Mac
 Hailey Evans as Felicia
 Sid Clawson as Tye
 Michael Birkeland as Scott
 Aaron De Jesus as Chauffeur
 Reb Fleming as Doctor

Awards

References

External links
The official website of Heber Holiday

2007 films
2007 romantic comedy films
American romantic comedy films
2000s English-language films
2000s American films